Steffen Möller (born 22 January 1969 in Wuppertal) is a German teacher, actor, satirist and stand-up artist, living and performing in Poland and Germany. Known there from the Europa da się lubić TV show and the M jak miłość soap opera (as Stefan Müller). He was also the host for the first season (running from September 2005 to December of the same year) of the Polish edition of the TV show Wetten, dass..? (known there as Załóż się). Since 2008 he has performed on various stand-up comedy tours in Germany, Poland and Austria.

In Mamy cię! (a Polish version of Surprise, Surprise), he was called "The First German of the Third Polish Republic". On 3 June 2005, he was given the Federal Cross of Merit on Ribbon of Germany for merits in developing Polish-German relations. He lives in Warsaw and Berlin.

Discography
 2003 Niemiec na Młocinach Stand-up Comedy, Live-CD in Polish
 2004 E, tam Unia! Stand-up Comedy, Live-CD in Polish
 2006 "Wakacje w Niemczech" Stand-up Comedy, Live-CD in Polish
 2008 "Najpiękniejsze baśnie Braci Grimm". Audio-CD read by Steffen Möller, Axel Springer Polska, Warsawa 
 2008 Viva Polonia. Audio-CD. Read by Steffen Möller. Argon Verlag, Berlin,   (in German)
 2009 Viva Polonia: Live in Berlin, Argon Verlag, Berlin,   (in German)
 2009 Vita Classica. Audio-CD. Read by Steffen Möller. Argon Verlag, Berlin,   (in German)
 2012 Expedition zu den Polen: Eine Reise mit dem Berlin-Warszawa-Express (Audio-CD), Osterwoldaudio Verlag,   (in German)

Filmography
 2000-2007 M jak miłość
 2000 Słoneczna włócznia
 2002 Kasia i Tomek
 2003 Koniec wojny
 2003-2008 
 2005 
 2010 Polen für Anfänger (Poland for beginners) (road movie, Regie: Katrin Rothe; mit Kurt Krömer)
 2012 Expedition zu den Polen (Liveshow + Bonus), Steffen Möller

Books
 2006 Polska da się lubić, Warsaw,  (in Polish)
 2007 Niemiecki ze Steffenem, with Mariusz Kisielewski and Aneta Głowska, Warsaw, 
 2008 Viva Polonia: als deutscher Gastarbeiter in Polen, Frankfurt am Main 2008,   (in German)
 2009 Vita Classica: Bekenntnisse eines Andershörenden, Frankfurt am Main 2009,   (in German)
 2012 Expedition zu den Polen: Eine Reise mit dem Berlin-Warszawa-Express, Malik Verlag,   (in German)

References

External links
 Official website in German and Polish

German male television actors
German satirists
1969 births
Living people
Mass media people from Wuppertal
Recipients of the Cross of the Order of Merit of the Federal Republic of Germany
German expatriates in Poland
German emigrants to Poland
German male non-fiction writers